Jim Kane (1937–2003) was an American high school coach.

James or Jim Kane may also refer to:

 James Kane (1895–1964), politician
 Jim Kane (baseball) (1881–1947), American baseball player
 Jim Kane (American football) (1896–1976), American football player

See also
James Cain (disambiguation)
James Caine (disambiguation)
James Caan (disambiguation)
James Cane (disambiguation)
James Cayne (born 1934), businessman